Switzerland entered the Eurovision Song Contest 1992 with Daisy Auvray and the song "Mister Music Man". "Mister Music Man" was composed by Gordon Dent.

Before Eurovision

National final 
The Swiss broadcaster, SRG SSR idée suisse, hosted a national final to select the Swiss entry for the Eurovision Song Contest 1992, held in Malmö, Sweden. 

The final was held at the Palazzo dei Congressi in Lugano on 23 February 1992, hosted by Alessandra Marchese. 10 songs competed, with the winner decided through the votes of 3 regional juries, an expert jury and a press jury.

The winner of the contest was Géraldine Olivier with the song "Soleil, soleil". However after the contest the song was disqualified after it was revealed that the song was inputted into the French-speaking broadcaster, Télévision Suisse Romande (TSR), for their selection for the contest with French lyrics and was rejected, before being entered into the German-speaking broadcaster, Schweizer Fernsehen (SF), and their selection for the contest with German lyrics and accepted. Therefore the song that came second, "Mister Music Man" by Daisy Auvray went to Malmö for Switzerland.

At Eurovision
Auvray performed 13th on the night of the contest, following Finland and preceding Luxembourg. She received 32 points, placing 15th in a field of 23.

The Swiss conductor at the contest was Roby Seidel.

Voting

References

External links
Swiss National Final 1992

1992
Countries in the Eurovision Song Contest 1992
Eurovision